The Chambre des notaries du Québec, or Chambre of Notaries of Quebec, is the regulatory body for the practice of notaries in the province of Quebec and one of two legal regulatory bodies in the province.

Founded in 1870 as the Provincial Chamber of Notaries after the merger of three regional notary bodies (Quebec, Trois-Riveries, and Montreal), it traces back to the regulation of notaries by the French since 1663.

References

See also

 Bar of Quebec
 Bar of Montreal

Quebec
Legal organizations based in Quebec
Notaries
1870 establishments in Quebec
Organizations established in 1870